Ilja is a given name and surname. The given name is cognate to Ilya. 

Notable people with the given name include:

Ilja Bereznickas (born 1948), Lithuanian animator, illustrator, scriptwriter and caricaturist
Ilja Bergh (1927–2015), Danish pianist and composer
Ilja Dragunov (born 1993), Russian professional wrestler
Ilja Glebov (born 1987), Estonian pair skater
Ilja Hurník (1922–2013), Czech composer, pianist and essayist
Ilja Leonard Pfeijffer (born 1968), Dutch poet, novelist, polemicist and classic scholar
Ilja Richter (born 1952), German actor
Ilja Rosendahl (born 1968), German film and music producer, actor, songwriter and musician
Ilja Seifert (1951–2022), German politician
Ilja Syrovatko, Russian professional basketball player, who plays in Dynamo Moscow
Ilja Szrajbman (1907–1943), Polish Olympic freestyle swimmer
Ilja Venäläinen (born 1980), Finnish football player
Ilja Wiederschein (born 1977), volleyball player from Germany

Notable people with the surname include:
Ivari Ilja, Estonian pianist best known for his work as an accompanist
Joze Ilja, Yugoslav slalom canoeist who competed in the mid-1950s

See also
Ilya, Belarus, also transliterated as Ilja
Ilia, given name
Ilija, given name